The men's triple jump event  at the 1999 IAAF World Indoor Championships was held on March 5.

Results

1 Dimitrov originally won the silver medal, but was disqualified for doping.

References
Results

Triple
Triple jump at the World Athletics Indoor Championships